Susanna Hirzel, known as Susette (1769–1858) was a Swiss painter.

Born in Zürich, Hirzel was the niece of painter Heinrich Hirzel, and studied briefly with August Friedrich Oelenhainz and a member of the Füssli family; she was, however, mainly self-taught. She married Ratsherr Hans Conrad Ott in 1801. Her brother Caspar was a soldier in the service of France, active as an amateur artist as well. Hirzel produced portraits in oil and pastel, and her work is represented in numerous collections in her native city.

References

1769 births
1858 deaths
Swiss women painters
18th-century Swiss painters
18th-century Swiss women artists
19th-century Swiss painters
19th-century Swiss women artists
Swiss portrait painters
Pastel artists
Artists from Zürich